Roller skating and roller hockey were contested at the 1991 Pan American Games, held in August in Havana, Cuba.



Roller skating

Men's events
Speed

Women's events
Speed

Roller hockey

Men

Medal table

References

Events at the 1991 Pan American Games
1991
1991 in roller sports